The Surinamese Chess Championship is organized by the Suriname Chess Federation, which was established in 1955. It was first held in December 1945. The Surinamese Women's Chess Championship was first held in 1989.

National championship winners
{| class="sortable wikitable"
! Year !! National champion
|-
| 1945 ||Baltus Jessurun
|-
| 1947 ||Alfred Soares
|-
| 1948 || Alfred Soares
|-
| 1949 || L. Kanteman
|-
| 1950 ||L. Kanteman
|-
| 1951 || C. de Boer
|-
| 1952 || Alfred Soares
|-
| 1953 || C. de Boer
|-
| 1954 || C. de Boer
|-
| 1955 ||C. de Boer
|-
| 1956 || Jules Jacobs
|-
| 1958 || Jules Jacobs
|-
| 1959 ||Jules Jacobs
|-
| 1960 || Jules Jacobs
|-
| 1961 || Jules Jacobs
|-
| 1962 || Lothar Saam
|-
| 1963 || Jules Jacobs
|-
| 1964 || Lothar Saam
|-
| 1965 || Lothar Saam
|-
| 1966 || Brouwn
|-
| 1967 || Brouwn
|-
| 1968 || Theo van Philips
|-
| 1969 || Theo van Philips
|-
| 1970 ||Lothar Saam
|-
| 1971 || Theo van Philips
|-
| 1972 || Theo van Philips
|-
| 1973 ||Theo van Philips
|-
| 1974 ||Piet Sonneveld
|-
| 1975 || Wim Veer Sr.
|-
| 1976 || Wim Veer Sr.
|-
| 1977 || Wim Veer Sr.
|-
| 1978 || Wim Veer Sr.
|-
| 1979 ||Lothar Saam
|-
| 1980 ||Wim Veer Sr.
|-
| 1981 ||Jerome Lindeboom
|-
| 1982 || tournament not completed
|-
| 1983 || Dewperkash Gajadin
|-
| 1984 || Kiem Thin Tjong Tjin Joe
|-
| 1985 ||Kiem Thin Tjong Tjin Joe
|-
| 1986 ||Wim Veer Jr.
|-
| 1987 || Endy Kasanardjo
|-
| 1988 ||Endy Kasanardjo
|-
| 1989 ||Franklin Mungroo
|-
| 1990 ||Dewperkash Gajadin
|-
| 1991 || Geert Peeters
|-
| 1992 ||Roger Matoewi
|- 
| 1993 ||Geert Peeters
|-
| 1994 || tournament not held
|- 
| 1995 || Julian Neyhorst
|-
| 1996 || Julian Neyhorst
|-
| 1997 || Julian Neyhorst
|- 
| 1998 ||Julian Neyhorst
|-
| 1999 ||Roger Matoewi
|-
| 2000 ||Michael Siban
|-
| 2001 ||Franklin Mungroo
|-
| 2002 || Roger Matoewi
|-
| 2003 || Roger Matoewi
|-
| 2004 || Roger Matoewi
|-
| 2005 ||Dewperkash Gajadin
|-
| 2006 || Roger Matoewi
|-
| 2007 || Roger Matoewi
|-
| 2008 || Roger Matoewi
|-
| 2009 ||Suradj Hanoeman
|-
| 2010 || Roger Matoewi
|-
| 2011 ||Roger Matoewi
|-
| 2012 || Romario Sanches
|-
| 2013 || Romario Sanches
|-
| 2014 ||Romario Sanches
|-
| 2015 ||Roger Matoewi
|- 
| 2016 ||Roger Matoewi
|- 
| 2017 ||Roger Matoewi
|- 
| 2018 ||Roger Matoewi
|- 
| 2019 ||Romario Sanches
|}

Women's championship winners

{| class="sortable wikitable"
! Year !! National women's champion
|-
| 1989 || Aruna Jarbandhan
|-
| 1990 ||Aruna Jarbandhan
|-
| 2002 || Charissa Parmanand
|-
| 2003 ||Charissa Parmanand
|-
| 2004 || 
|-
| 2005 || Victoria Naipal
|-
| 2006 || Victoria Naipal
|-
| 2007 || Victoria Naipal
|-
| 2008 || Victoria Naipal
|-
| 2009 ||Ekatarina Naipal
|-
| 2010 ||Victoria Naipal
|-
| 2011 ||Ekatarina Naipal
|-
| 2012 || 
|-
| 2013 || Rosangela dos Ramos
|-
| 2014 ||Reyna Freyde
|-
| 2015 || Rosangela dos Ramos
|- 
| 2016 ||Rosangela dos Ramos
|- 
| 2017 ||Rosangela dos Ramos
|- 
| 2018 ||Rosangela dos Ramos
|- 
| 2019 ||Catherine Kaslan
|}

References

Chess in Suriname
Chess national championships
Women's chess national championships
Chess
Recurring sporting events established in 1945
Recurring sporting events established in 1989
Chess
Chess
1945 in chess
1989 in chess
Annual events in Suriname